{{Infobox lake
| name               = Lac Achard
| image              = Lac Achard, Isère.jpg
| caption            =
| image_bathymetry   =
| caption_bathymetry =
| location           = Isère
| coords             = 
| type               =
|pushpin_map=France
| inflow             = precipitation| outflow            = L'Arselle
| catchment          =
| basin_countries    = France
| length             =
| width              =
| area               =
| depth              =
| max-depth          =
| volume             =
| residence_time     =
| shore              =
| elevation          = 
| frozen             =
| islands            = none''
| cities             =
| reference          =
}}Lac Achard''' is a lake in Isère, France.

Achard